Garden Hill (or ) is a 300-foot-tall (90.6-metre) hill in the Sham Shui Po District in northwestern Kowloon, Hong Kong, near , Om Yau and Pak Tin. Its summit is a popular place among photographers for its views of urban Hong Kong. One entrance to the trail leading to the summit can be found next to Grade II historic building Mei Ho House.

Name
The hill's name comes from the nearby former headquarters of the Garden Company, known locally for its cookies and bakery products.

See also

 Geography of Hong Kong
 List of mountains, peaks and hills in Hong Kong
 Sham Shui Po
 Shek Kip Mei
 Woh Chai Shan aka. Shek Kip Mei Hill aka. Bishop Hill, a nearby hill in Shek Kip Mei

References

Sham Shui Po District